The Pup'o Line is a non-electrified standard-gauge secondary railway line of the Korean State Railway in Kangryŏng-gun, South Hwanghae Province, North Korea, running from Sin'gangryŏng on the Ongjin Line to Pup'o.

History
The line was opened by the Korean State Railway in the 1970s.

Route

A yellow background in the "Distance" box indicates that section of the line is not electrified.

References

Railway lines in North Korea
Standard gauge railways in North Korea